The Chatham Memorial Arena is an ice hockey arena located in Chatham, Ontario, Canada.  It was built in 1949. The arena seats approximately 2,500 spectators and is the home to the Chatham Maroons of the Greater Ontario Junior Hockey League.  Located in a residential area on the south side of Chatham, the Memorial Arena has seen numerous renovations in the past ten years, the most recent addition being the installation of a larger, more modern score clock as well as improved lighting.

The Chatham Memorial Arena is the largest sports venue in the municipality of Chatham-Kent.  The facility houses ice hockey and figure skating in the winter and ball hockey in the summer.  It is also an integral part of the annual Jaycee Fair festivities.

Amenities in the venue are limited.  With only two concession stands, one souvenir stand and single washrooms, the arena is outdated.  However, the arena features a very rustic if not rough atmosphere, and the local fans do their best to add to this.

History

The arena was built in 1949 on the grounds of a training area used by the Canadian Forces during World War II.  When the war ended the region no longer required such a large amount of land for military purposes so the Memorial Arena was erected. Display cases along the east side of the building give glimpses into the past of the Memorial Arena as well as the teams that have called it home.  The arena was the home of the Chatham Maroons senior team that won the 1960 Allan Cup as a member of the OHA Senior "A" Hockey League and won the 1950 Turner Cup as International Hockey League champions.

The single retired number hanging from the rafters belongs to former Chatham MicMac (now named Jr. Maroons) Brian Wiseman.  His number 9 was retired after Wiseman left Chatham to play for the University of Michigan Wolverines.  Approximately 3,600 spectators were in attendance (1,118 over the capacity, the largest crowd at Memorial since its opening day in 1949) to see Wiseman break Ed Olczyk's single season point record.  Wiseman amassed 147 points in just 40 games in 1989-90.  He went on to be drafted by the New York Rangers late in the NHL Entry Draft.  Wiseman played games for the Chicago Wolves, St. John's Maple Leafs, Toronto Maple Leafs and the Houston Aeros before retiring due to concussion problems.  Wiseman was named the IHL's Most Valuable Player in 1999.

Arena future
Chatham-Kent City Council has been entertaining the idea of building a new home for Chatham's junior hockey.  The proposals have included a 5,000 seat venue on St. Clair College's Thames Campus.  The campus is already the location of Thames Campus Arena, which would be coupled with a second ice surface, gym, Olympic-sized pool and convention hall.  Other proposals include a complete overhaul of the Memorial Arena or a 6,000-seat new arena, which would dash any hope of a future Ontario Hockey League franchise for the region.

The council has yet to announce any plans and continues to look into the matter.  Chatham was targeted by former NHLers Dale and Mark Hunter to be the home of an Ontario Hockey League team.  The Hunters planned on assisting in the financing for renovations to the Memorial Arena as well as the construction of a brand new 5,500 seat modern facility.  City Council refused to commit any funds to the endeavour and the Hunters have since left town to purchase the now highly successful London Knights of the OHL.

Current teams
Chatham Maroons - Western Ontario Hockey League

Past teams
Chatham Wheels - Colonial Hockey League
Chatham Maroons - International Hockey League/OHA Senior A Hockey League

References

1949 establishments in Ontario
Buildings and structures in Chatham-Kent
Indoor arenas in Ontario
Indoor ice hockey venues in Ontario
Sports venues in Ontario